Venčac is a village in the municipality of Aleksandrovac, Serbia. According to the 2011 census, the village has a population of 382 inhabitants.

Population

References

Populated places in Rasina District